The 1956 Campeonato Profesional was the ninth season of Colombia's top-flight football league. 13 teams compete against one another and played each weekend. Atlético Quindío won the league for 1st time in its history after getting 37 points. Independiente Medellín, the defending champion, was 5th with 30 points.

Background
13 teams competed in the tournament: Deportivo Pereira, Atlético Bucaramanga and Unión Magdalena returned, Deportivo Cali was not admitted, and Libertad de Barranquilla was created. Atlético Quindío won the championship for first time, with its goalscorer Jaime Gutiérrez becoming the first Colombian topscorer in the league (before him, only foreign players achieved this).

League system
Every team played two games against each other team, one at home and one away. Teams received two points for a win and one point for a draw. If two or more teams were tied on points, places were determined by goal difference. The team with the most points is the champion of the league.

Teams

Final standings

Results

Top goalscorers

Source: RSSSF.com Colombia 1956

References

External links
Dimayor Official Page

Prim
Colombia
Categoría Primera A seasons